Thore Göran Andersson (4 October 1939 – 18 November 2020) was a Swedish sailor. He competed in the Finn event at the 1960 Summer Olympics.

References

External links
 

1939 births
2020 deaths
Swedish male sailors (sport)
Olympic sailors of Sweden
Sailors at the 1960 Summer Olympics – Finn
People from Lysekil Municipality
Sportspeople from Västra Götaland County